Fandriana is a town and commune in Central Highlands of Madagascar. It belongs to the district of Fandriana, which is a part of Amoron'i Mania Region. It has a population of 29,232 inhabitants (2018).

The town provides access to hospital services to its citizens. It is also a site of industrial-scale  mining.

Farming and raising livestock provides employment for 45% and 35% of the working population. The most important crop is rice, while other important products are cassava and sweet potatoes. Industry and services provide employment for 5% and 15% of the population, respectively.

The town is located at  41 km National Road 41 from Ambositra.

Rivers
The Fisakana.

References 

Populated places in Amoron'i Mania